Minas (also Romanized as Mīnās) is a village in Kenarporuzh Rural District, in the Central District of Salmas County, West Azerbaijan Province, Iran. At the 2006 census, its population was 565, in 137 families.

References 

Populated places in Salmas County